The Ottoman persecution of Alevis is best known in connection with the Ottoman sultan Selim I's reign (1512–1520) and his war against the Safavids in 1514. But there are examples that indicate that there already existed problems with Alevi groups in the Ottoman Empire since the 14th century, The Alevis were generally persecuted for sympathizing in the negative role of Safavids.

Persecution of Alevi-like groups before 1500

14th century 
Ottoman problems with heterodox Muslim groups already existed in the 14th century. An example of this can be found in Seyyid Ali Sultan's (also called Kızıldeli) hagiography, which mentions a certain dervish called Seyyid Rüstem (d. 1421). Accordingly, Seyyid Rüstem got in trouble with the local Ottoman officials, despite the fact that he had a personal agreement with the sultan Orhan I to obtain some soil. As the official had heard of Seyyid Rüstem, he shouted: "How dare this  make a mark on my land and depart from obedience? How can he live without my permission?" It should be mentioned that the term  was a typical and often condescending name for Qālandar people.

This may mark a change in the Ottoman position, from accepting the relatively heterodox status quo in Anatolia, into more closely following orthodox Islamic law (Sharia), which did not fall on fertile ground among the more heterodox dervishes. This is also an example of how the Ottoman Sultans went from tribal and clan-based leadership, which had been the situation of Osman I and Orhan I, to more centralist leadership, leading to a decrease of local autonomy.

15th century 
A growing number of rebellions and problems occurred within the Empire 15th century onwards. Among the most notable examples include the Sheikh Bedreddin rebellion, which began in 1416. This rebellion is believed to have been caused by a culmination of socio-economic and religious tensions. The rebellion, which was also supported by non-Muslims, was eventually defeated, and Sheikh Bedreddin was executed with his apostles in 1420.

It is also known that the heterodox Shiite sect hurufiyya was widely spread in Iran and Anatolia and that they made propaganda in large parts of the Ottoman Empire. In 1445 a group of Hurufis managed to personally meet Sultan Mehmed II, with the intention to invite him to the Hurufi faith. The sultan allowed them to speak for their cause, and also showed clear signs of interest in their mystical doctrines. This aroused discontent among Mehmed II's closest advisers who were not however, able to take direct action. They thus decided to call a scholar named Fakhr al-Din 'Ajami, who pretended to be interested in the Hurufi doctrines and therefore invited the leader of the present Hurufis to his home. However, when the Hurufi explained his faith, Fakhr al-Din could not keep himself from shouting "heretic!". The Hurufi then attempted to seek refuge with Mehmed II, but was subdued by Fakhr al-Din's aggressive behavior and therefore held back from defending his guests. The Hurufis were subsequently led to the new mosque in Edirne, where Fakhr al-Din publicly denounced their faith and preached the spiritual rewards, one would obtain by attending to the extermination of their faith. The Hurufi Order was then ordered to make a huge bonfire to burn their own leader. The head of the Hurufis was then thrown on the fire and the other Hurufis were otherwise executed.

In the subsequent part of Mehmed II's reign the Ottoman Empire became extended towards both east and west and thus incorporated new areas where there were a greater propensity of heterodoxy. Hurufis and other heterodox Sufi groups were still subject to persecution and isolated massacres in various parts of the Ottoman Empire, however.

In the mid-15th century there was also strife between the Ottoman Empire and the semi-autonomic Karaman area. In 1468–1474 disputes led Mehmed II to drive out tribes, possibly Qizilbāsh, from this area to Rumelia and in 1475 he made an end to the Karaman rule.

Persecution of Alevis after 1500

During Bayezid II (1481–1512) 
During the sultan Bayezid II the relationship between the state and heterodox groups further worsened. Already by the assassination of the Safavid spiritual leader Shaykh Haydar in 1488, in a letter the Ottoman Sultan Bayezid II had expressed that the news has multiplied my joy and about Haydar's supporters, the Qizilbāshes, he said: may God curse Haydar's heretical followers. Only four years later, in 1492, there was an attempt of murdering the sultan by a dervish and a document from 1501 also reveals that Bayezid II had ordered the execution of all Qizilbāshes who were captured from traveling to Iran. The rest of his reign was also marked by numerous Qizilbāsh rebellions, which Bayezid II tried to overcome by deporting thousands of Qizilbāsh from Anatolia to some of the new conquered coastal areas of Greece: Morea, Modon, Coron and Lepanto. The official reason for the deportations was that Qizilbāshes according to religious scholars were "infidels".

The oldest preserved religious statement (fatwa) on the Qizilbāshes was also issued under Bayezid II by the then Ottoman Mufti Hamza Saru Görez (d. 1512).

During Selim I (1512–1520) 
Bayezid II's son, Selim I, however did not think his father had taken sufficiently hard measures against the Qizilbāshes. As governor of Trabzon, he had been closely acquainted with the Safavids and the Qizilbāsh success in Iran and eastern Anatolia. Against his father's desire he had also repeatedly mobilized military forces and made attacks on Safavid land. It is also known that Selim I had a great hatred towards Shia Muslims in general, especially the heterodox Qizilbāsh. Therefore, liquidated three of his brothers and forced deposed his father to abdicate to himself to seize power. He then sent his father Bayezid II off on a supposed vacation after which he too was killed.

Upon ascending to the throne, Selim I gotthe Ottoman Shaykh ul-Islam ibni Kemal (d. 1533) to issue a new fatwa against the Qizilbāshes to finally legitimize their killing. He then gathered a great army consisting of 200,000 men to lead a gratuitous war against the Safavids. On his march to face Ismā'il at Chāldirān, Selim had many Alevis massacred, seeing them as enemies of the Ottoman Empire.

However, Ottoman  of that time, in which all demographics and taxpayers for each village were registered, do not justify the specifics of these claims. Likewise, Ottoman historians studying , official records for the local disputes,  did not find evidence for such a huge death toll. When the total population of that time is considered, 40,000 is more than the total of nine large cities in Anatolia. Thus, majority of the Ottoman historians believe that the leaders of the insurgent Alevi groups were killed and that remained in social memory of the Anatolian Alevis.

After Selim I 

After Selim I's reign, subsequent sultans continued harsh treatment towards Qizilbāshes in Anatolia. Qizilbāshes responded to the oppression by revolting against the Ottoman rule. These frequent rebellions continued periodically up to the early 17th century.

The extremely violent period from 16th to the 17th century, however, was eventually relatively subdued, but the oppression of Qizilbāshes continued to a lesser extent.

Typical persecution methods 
From the early 16th century the Ottoman administration specialized in chasing Qizilbāshes. This century was perhaps the harshest century for the Alevis (Qizilbāshes). They were persecuted for both sympathizing with the Safavid struggle, but also because of their beliefs, which were considered heretical. In order to capture Qizilbāshes, the Ottoman state used several methods. Being Qizilbāsh was a crime on its own and Qizilbāshes were kept under constant surveillance. Some of the most frequently used surveillance and persecution methods in the Ottoman Empire were:

 Persecution based on others' reports/notifications.
 Open or secret persecution.
 By asking people who were regarded as more credible or objective, for example officials or Sunnis.

Typical punishment methods 
The Ottomans also had different methods of punishment used on Qizilbāshes. Most of the punishments took place by fabricating a reason to kill them. These false accusations were often led into the formal procedures to make them seem more realistic. In cases where the accused Qizilbāshes had many sympathizers or relatives, the Ottoman regime tried to avoid riots by not killing too many at a time.

Some of the most common punishments were:

The most typical displacement locations were Cyprus, Modon, Coroni, Budun(?) and Plovdiv.
Imprisonment: Some were also jailed and then usually expelled to Cyprus to cut them off from their families.
Forced labor: Another method of punishment was to send Qizilbāshs for forced labor on galleys where they should work as oarsmen.
Drowning: Some Qizilbāshes were executed by being drowned in the Halys River, others were executed on the spot. Other times Qizilbāshes were executed with the sole purpose of deterring other Qizilbāshes and teaching them a lesson.
 Stoning: Although stoning was normally only used against people who had committed adultery, this method of punishment was also used. There is an example of a Qizilbāsh named Koyun Baba who was stoned because of his faith.

Religious rulings (fatwa) 
The first religious statement on the Qizilbāshes was probably issued under Bayezid II within the first years of the 16th century, but the oldest preserved fatwa is the one belonging to Hamza Saru Görez (d. 1512), an Ottoman Mufti of Bayezid II's reign:

Prohibition of the Bektashi Order (1826) 

From the 19th century the Bektashis who meanwhile had benefited from an Ottoman acceptance also suffered persecution. This began after the Ottoman abolition of the Bektashi Janissary Corps in 1826.

According to historian Patrick Kinross, Sultan Mahmud II had knowingly encouraged drummer to revolt as part of the sultan's "coup against the Janissaries." Through a fatwa, the sultan informed them that he was about to create a new army, organized and trained in accordance with European standards. As expected, the Janissaries then drew mutinied and advanced against the sultan's palace. In the following battle the Janissary barracks took fire because of a heavy artillery attack. This resulted in the killing of 4,000–8,000) Janissaries. The survivors were then either expelled or executed and their possessions were confiscated by the sultan. This event is called  (the Auspicious Event).

The remaining Janissaries were then executed by beheading in a tower in Thessaloniki, which was later called "the Blood Tower". In this context, a fatwa was also issued, which allowed the prohibition of the Bektashi Sufi Order. The former leader of the Bektashi Order, Hamdullah Çelebi, was initially sentenced to death, but then sent into exile in Amasya where his mausoleum exists today. Hundreds of Bektashi tekkes were closed and the working dervishes and babas were either executed or expelled. Some of the closed tekkes were transferred to the Sunni Naqshbandi Order. It all resulted in the execution of 4,000–7,500 Bektashis and the demolition of at least 550 big Bektashi monasteries. The official reasons given for the prohibition of the Bektashi Order were heresy and moral deviation.

Implications of persecution 

This centuries-long suppression has led to a general fear among Alevis. This has meant that until recently they have tended to keep their identity hidden from strangers. Their religious assemblies have also been practised secretly with several guards having to keep watch. Suppression has also been one of the reasons that Alevis often held their religious assemblies at nights.

It is also noteworthy that most Alevi villages and settlements are very remote. They are usually located in high mountain areas, in deep valleys or surrounded by dense forest areas. Only a minority of Alevi villages are located on lush and level plains.

These circumstances have also caused Alevis to feel like second-class citizens even after the founding of the Republic of Turkey. Alevis are often assessed from a Sunni perspective, and may need to defend themselves on issues such as why they do not pray in mosques or fast during Ramadan.

See also
Persecution of Ottoman Muslims
Ottoman casualties of World War I
Destruction of Kashmiri Shias

References

Notes

Sources

History of the Alevis
Islam in the Ottoman Empire
Alevis
Alevi massacres
Anti-Shi'ism
Violence against Shia Muslims